The Micah Williams House is a historic house at 342 William Street in Stoneham, Massachusetts.  The -story Greek Revival cottage was built c. 1830 by Micah Williams.  Unlike many Greek Revival buildings, which have the gable end facing the street, this one has the front on the roof side, a more traditional colonial orientation.  Its facade is five bays wide, with a center entrance sheltered by a hip-roof portico with square columns.  The house was built by Williams (who lived across the street) for his daughter.

The house was listed on the National Register of Historic Places in 1984.

See also
Williams-Linscott House, also owned by Micah Williams
National Register of Historic Places listings in Stoneham, Massachusetts
National Register of Historic Places listings in Middlesex County, Massachusetts

References

Houses on the National Register of Historic Places in Stoneham, Massachusetts
Houses completed in 1830
Houses in Stoneham, Massachusetts
1830 establishments in Massachusetts
Greek Revival architecture in Massachusetts